The New York Yankees farm system consists of seven Minor League Baseball affiliates in the United States and Dominican Republic. Five teams are owned by the major league club, while two—the Somerset Patriots and Hudson Valley Renegades—are independently owned.

The Yankees have been affiliated with the Rookie Florida Complex League Yankees of the Florida Complex League since 1980, making it the longest-running active affiliation in the organization. It is also the longest affiliation in the team's history. Their newest affiliates are the Somerset Patriots, which became the Yankees' Double-A affiliate in 2021, and the Hudson Valley Renegades, which became their High-A affiliate in 2021.

2021–present
The current structure of Minor League Baseball is the result of an overall contraction of the system beginning with the 2021 season. Class A was reduced to two levels: High-A and Low-A. Class A Short Season teams and domestic Rookie League teams that operated away from Spring Training facilities were eliminated. Low-A was reclassified as Single-A in 2022.

1990–2020
Minor League Baseball operated with six classes from 1990 to 2020. The Class A level was subdivided for a second time with the creation of Class A-Advanced. The Rookie level consisted of domestic and foreign circuits.

1963–1989
The foundation of the minors' current structure was the result of a reorganization initiated by Major League Baseball (MLB) before the 1963 season. The reduction from six classes to four (Triple-A, Double-AA, Class A, and Rookie) was a response to the general decline of the minors throughout the 1950s and early-1960s when leagues and teams folded due to shrinking attendance caused by baseball fans' preference for staying at home to watch MLB games on television. The only change made within the next 27 years was Class A being subdivided for the first time to form Class A Short Season in 1966.

1932–1962
The minors operated with six classes (Triple-A, Double-A, and Classes A, B, C, and D) from 1946 to 1962. The Pacific Coast League (PCL) was reclassified from Triple-A to Open in 1952 due to the possibility of becoming a third major league. This arrangement ended following the 1957 season when the relocation of the National League's Dodgers and Giants to the West Coast killed any chance of the PCL being promoted. The 1963 reorganization resulted in the Eastern and South Atlantic Leagues being elevated from Class A to Double-A, five of seven Class D circuits plus the ones in B and C upgraded to A, and the Appalachian League reclassified from D to Rookie.

See also
New York Yankees minor league players

References

External links
 Major League Baseball Prospect News: New York Yankees
 Baseball-Reference: New York Yankees League Affiliations

 
Minor league affiliates